Barry McAuliffe (born 18 October 1943) is a former Australian rules footballer who played for the North Melbourne Football Club in the Victorian Football League (VFL).

Notes

External links 

Living people
1943 births
Australian rules footballers from Victoria (Australia)
North Melbourne Football Club players
People educated at University High School, Melbourne